"Virus" is a single from Iron Maiden, released in 1996. It is the first single since 1980's "Women in Uniform" that does not appear on any official Iron Maiden studio album. It was, however, featured as a brand new track on the band's first ever career retrospective – 1996's double-disc Best of the Beast. It is the only Iron Maiden song to be credited to both of the band's guitarists. It has never been performed live by Iron Maiden, but Blaze Bayley performed it several times in his solo career. Lyrically, the song warns of rising business and government corruption in an increasingly Internet-dependent world.

Background
In order to celebrate the band's 21 years, the single was released in three different formats. The first format, contains a short edit omitting the intro and features the same B-sides as the "Lord of the Flies" single from 1996, which included covers from The Who and UFO. These tracks were previously unreleased in the UK. The second features the full-length unedited version and songs from the 1979 compilation album Metal for Muthas, which marks the only studio recordings to feature former guitarist Tony Parsons. The third features two songs from Maiden's legendary 1978 demo recordings, The Soundhouse Tapes.

The single was the last until 2015's "Speed of Light" to use the classic variant of the band's logo: every single release from 1998's "The Angel and the Gambler" to 2010's "El Dorado" used an alternate that removed the extended ends of the "R", "M", and both "N's".

On the EP Slow Riot for New Zero Kanada by instrumental rock group Godspeed You! Black Emperor, the track "BBF3" features a vox pop interview to a person going by the name of Blaise Bailey Finnegan III who recites a poem made from the lyrics from "Virus", written by Blaze Bayley.

The intro riff was used by the Bristol-based trio Kosheen on the song "I Want It All" from their 2001 album Resist.

Track listing

CD 1
 "Virus (Short Version)" (Steve Harris, Janick Gers, Dave Murray, Blaze Bayley) - 3:54
 "My Generation" (Pete Townshend; The Who cover) - 3:39
 "Doctor Doctor" (Michael Schenker, Phil Mogg; UFO cover) - 4:50

CD 2
 "Virus" (Harris, Gers, Murray, Bayley) - 6:14
 "Sanctuary" (Harris; from the 1979 compilation album Metal for Muthas) - 3:33
 "Wrathchild" (Harris; from the 1979 compilation album Metal for Muthas) - 3:06

12" vinyl
 "Virus" (Harris, Gers, Murray, Bayley)
 "Prowler" (Harris; from the 1978 demo The Soundhouse Tapes)
 "Invasion" (Harris; from the 1978 demo The Soundhouse Tapes)

Promotional CD for radio stations
 "Virus" - 3:53
 "Man on the Edge" - 4:11
 "Afraid to Shoot Strangers (Live in 1995) - 6:48
 "2 Minutes to Midnight" - 6:02
 "The Trooper" - 4:13
 "The Number of the Beast" - 4:52
 "Wrathchild" - 2:54
 "Strange World" (Unreleased Recording from The Soundhouse Tapes)  - 5:22
 "Iron Maiden" (from The Soundhouse Tapes) - 4:01

Personnel
Production credits are adapted from the CD covers.
Iron Maiden
Blaze Bayley – lead vocals ("Virus", "My Generation", "Doctor Doctor")
Dave Murray – guitar
Janick Gers – guitar ("Virus", "My Generation", "Doctor Doctor")
Steve Harris – bass guitar, producer, mixing
Nicko McBrain – drums ("Virus", "My Generation", "Doctor Doctor")
Paul Di'Anno – lead vocals ("Prowler", "Invasion". "Sanctuary", "Wrathchild")
Doug Sampson – drums ("Prowler", "Invasion", "Sanctuary", "Wrathchild")
Tony Parsons – guitar ("Sanctuary", "Wrathchild")
Paul Cairns – guitar (uncredited) ("Prowler, "Invasion") 
Production
Nigel Green – producer, mixing
Neal Harrison – producer ("Sanctuary", "Wrathchild")

Chart performance

References

Iron Maiden songs
1996 singles
Songs written by Steve Harris (musician)
Songs written by Blaze Bayley
Songs written by Janick Gers
1996 songs
EMI Records singles
Songs written by Dave Murray (musician)